Major General Sir Christopher Charles Teesdale  (1 June 1833 – 1 December 1893) was the first South African-born recipient of the Victoria Cross, the highest and most prestigious award for gallantry in the face of the enemy that can be awarded to British and Commonwealth forces.

Early life

Christopher Charles Teesdale was born in Grahamstown, Cape of Good Hope, to Lieutenant-General Henry George Teesdale of the Royal Artillery who was stationed there. He joined the Royal Artillery as a gentleman cadet on 29 April 1848. His first posting was to Corfu and he was promoted to second lieutenant on 22 March 1853 and left Corfu in April 1853.

Crimea

Teesdale was 22 years old, and a lieutenant in the Royal Regiment of Artillery, British Army during the Crimean War when the following deed took place for which he was awarded the VC.

On 29 September 1855 at Kars, Turkey, Lieutenant Teesdale volunteered to take command of the force engaged in the defence of the most advanced part of the works. He threw himself into the midst of the enemy and encouraged the garrison to make an attack so vigorous that the Russians were driven out. During the hottest part of the action he induced the Turkish artillerymen to return to their post from which they had been driven by enemy fire and after the final victorious charge he saved from the fury of the Turks a considerable number of the enemy wounded – an action gratefully acknowledged by the Russian Staff.

Teesdale was wounded at the battle of Kars, taken prisoner and held in Russia until he was released in 1856. He was awarded the Légion d'honneur and made an Honorary CB in the same year. A talented water colourist, he was responsible for illustrations in book on Battle of Kars by Humphry Sandwith, MD, the regiment's doctor at Kars. The illustrations were possibly done whilst Teesdale was in captivity.

He was decorated with the VC by Queen Victoria in the quadrangle of Windsor Castle on 21 November 1857 along with James Craig, George Symons and Joseph Malone.

Later life

He was appointed as Master of The Ceremonies and Extra Equerry to The Prince of Wales on 9 November 1858, positions he held until his death and was also made aide-de-camp to Queen Victoria on 1 October 1877. Promoted to Major-General in March 1887, he was made Knight Commander of St Michael and St George (KCMG) in the Queen's Jubilee honours on 8 July 1887. He retired on 22 March 1892 and was buried in his family tomb in South Bersted, Sussex. His VC is part of the Lord Ashcroft VC Collection at the Imperial War Museum.

References

Monuments to Courage (David Harvey, 1999)
The Register of the Victoria Cross (This England, 1997)
Major-General Christopher Teesdale, VC: The First South African-born Recipient of the Victoria Cross (Article by Ross Dix-Peek, 2008: http://peek_01.livejournal.com/26095.html)

External links

Location of grave and VC medal (West Sussex)

1833 births
1893 deaths
Royal Artillery officers
British Army generals
British recipients of the Victoria Cross
Crimean War recipients of the Victoria Cross
British Army personnel of the Crimean War
South African Knights Commander of the Order of St Michael and St George
South African recipients of the Victoria Cross
Officiers of the Légion d'honneur
People from Makhanda, Eastern Cape
British Army recipients of the Victoria Cross